Cygnus OB7 is an OB association in the giant Cygnus molecular cloud complex Cygnus X, with the North America Nebula and the Pelican Nebula. The Northern Coalsack Nebula of the Cygnus Rift lies in the foreground of this region. The molecular cloud has a large angular size of ∼4° × 7°.

References

Cygnus (constellation)
Stellar associations